Knud Storgaard Jensen (born 10 August 1972) is a Danish professional golfer.

Storgaard, who holds a master's degree in nuclear physics, first qualified for the European Tour in 1998 having won once on the Challenge Tour the previous year. His first season was unsuccessful, but he again qualified for the 2003 European Tour season; unfortunately at the same time it was discovered that he was suffering from testicular cancer. Because of the cancer, Storgaard didn't participate in the European Tour season, and as a result he got a medical extension for the 2004 European Tour season.

Amateur wins
1993 Danish National Amateur Championship

Professional wins (5)

Challenge Tour wins (1)

Nordic Golf League wins (4)

Team appearances
Professional
World Cup (representing Denmark): 1997

References

External links

Profile at www.golfonline.dk

Danish male golfers
European Tour golfers
Sportspeople from the Central Denmark Region
People from Skive Municipality
1972 births
Living people